Mark Lee McMorris (born December 9, 1993) is a Canadian professional snowboarder who specializes in slopestyle and big air events. A three-time Olympic bronze medallist, he placed third in each of the 2014 Winter Olympics, 2018 Winter Olympics, and 2022 Winter Olympics in the slopestyle event. While filming for Transworld Snowboarding's "Park Sessions" video in March 2011, Mark became the first person to land a Backside Triple Cork 1440. More recently, on April 28, 2018, Mark landed the world's first Double Cork off a rail, the Front-Board Double Cork 1170, with a melancholy grab. Mark has also left his mark at X-Games and other events. In 2012 and 2013, Mark won back-to-back gold medals in Winter X Games in the slopestyle event. In 2023 he defended his Winter X Games gold medal in the men's slopestyle to set a record for the most Winter X Games medals with 22.

He has also appeared in many videos for Transworld Snowboarding, Burton, Redbull, CBC, and Shredbots.

Career

Early career 
 
McMorris competed at his first FIS Snowboard World Cup during the 2009–2010 season, placing eighth in the big air event in Quebec City. He followed up with a World Cup victory in slopestyle in Calgary. At the Winter X Games XV in Aspen, Colorado, he won a silver medal in the slopestyle competition finishing behind fellow Canadian Sebastien Toutant. He won gold at the 2011 World Snowboard Tour's Air & Style competition beating out Peetu Piiroinen, Werner Stock, and Nils Arvidsson in the final. In 2012, McMorris won double gold at Winter X Games XVI. McMorris won gold in the big air event and the Slopestyle event. It was the first double gold at Winter X Games since Shaun White had in 2009.

2014 X-Games & Olympics
In the 2014 Winter X Games, McMorris placed 2nd behind fellow Canadian Max Parrot in the Slopestyle event. McMorris' hopes of a 3rd consecutive gold medal were dashed when he tripped on the rails, crashed, and fractured a rib during the 3rd and final run of the event. Despite the injury, McMorris still competed in the Winter Olympics in Sochi. As McMorris arrived in Sochi, he said he felt remarkably good, stating, "The amount of progress I've made since I broke my rib on Saturday has been unexplainable. I didn't believe I could be on this path, going this fast. At the same time, walking around an airport is different than going snowboarding and taking impact."

At the Olympics, McMorris fell on his first qualifying run and failed to make it through directly to the final with his score on his second run. In the semi-finals, he put up one of the top four scores to qualify for the final. There, he again fell on his first attempt. McMorris' second run was good enough to put him on the podium and win bronze. It was a tough couple of weeks for McMorris with his injury and a flood of different emotions. He said that "To get on the podium is just a dream come true. I can't explain this. I've just been through a roller coaster over these last few weeks."

Injuries
In February 2016, McMorris broke his right femur at Shaun White's Air + Style Big Air in Los Angeles. He attempted to do a frontside triple cork 1440, but in his landing, his toe edge was caught, which caused him to flip and break his femur. He had a long recovery, starting at Fortius Sport & Health in Vancouver. He was back snowboarding in July 2016 in Australia with some friends. A series of four episodes following his recovery was produced by X Games and aired in October 2016.

2018 Winter Olympics 
In 2017, McMorris went boarding in the backcountry at Whistler, British Columbia with some friends in late March 2017. He hit a tree and suffered serious, near-fatal injuries, and was in the ICU in Vancouver. His brother, Craig McMorris, spoke to The National shortly after the accident and described what had happened: "There was a fog [...] coming in and out, and Mark, unfortunately, drifted a little bit too far left, [...] we're hitting a feature, and he goes a little too far left and ends up in a clump of trees." McMorris suffered a fractured jaw, a fractured left arm, a ruptured spleen, a pelvic fracture, rib fractures and a collapsed left lung. He underwent two successful surgeries.

McMorris returned to snowboard competition and competed for Team Canada during the 2018 Winter Olympics, only eleven months after his accident. He placed third in Men's Slopestyle behind fellow Canadian Max Parrot and the American gold medalist Red Gerard, earning his second consecutive Olympic bronze medal. Following his long journey from injuries to a return to the podium, McMorris said that "Canada definitely had my back 100 percent, and I felt that. It was definitely motivating, and it gave me a little extra boost and energy to do my very best, and it feels really good when you end up doing well. I’m feeling really honoured to be on the podium again."

2022 Winter Olympics and 2023 X-Games 
McMorris was named to Canada's 2022 Olympic team in Beijing. On February 7, 2022, McMorris won a bronze medal in the slopestyle event, at the 2022 Winter Olympics, his third consecutive in the event.

At the 2023 Winter X Games McMorris defended his gold medal in the men's slopestyle to set a record for the most Winter X Games medals with 22, breaking a tie with Jamie Anderson of the United States.

Personal life
McMorris was born in Regina, Saskatchewan, Canada, and is the son of Saskatchewan provincial politician Don McMorris, a grain farmer, and Cindy McMorris, a nurse. His older brother, Craig McMorris, is also a professional snowboarder. McMorris attended Dr. Martin LeBoldus High School. McMorris also competed in wakeboarding before devoting himself to snowboarding. He has several tattoos, including one of sheaves of wheat representing the province of Saskatchewan. In 2006, when Mark was only 12, he rode his wakeboard around Lake Wascana pulled behind a dragon boat for 3.5 km in attempt to set a Guinness World Record. He was asked to take part after an event in Regina.

References

External links

Canadian male snowboarders
Living people
1993 births
Snowboarders at the 2014 Winter Olympics
Snowboarders at the 2018 Winter Olympics
Snowboarders at the 2022 Winter Olympics
Olympic snowboarders of Canada
Medalists at the 2014 Winter Olympics
Medalists at the 2018 Winter Olympics
Medalists at the 2022 Winter Olympics
Olympic bronze medalists for Canada
Olympic medalists in snowboarding
Sportspeople from Regina, Saskatchewan
X Games athletes